Eva Melicharová and Helena Vildová were the defending champions but did not compete that year.

Laura Montalvo and Paola Suárez won in the final 6–1, 6–2 against Tina Križan and Katarina Srebotnik.

Seeds
Champion seeds are indicated in bold text while text in italics indicates the round in which those seeds were eliminated.

 Barbara Schett /  Patty Schnyder (first round)
 Sabine Appelmans /  Kristie Boogert (semifinals)
 Laura Montalvo /  Paola Suárez (champions)
 Meike Babel /  Elena Wagner (quarterfinals)

Draw

External links
 1998 Piberstein Styrian Open Doubles Draw

WTA Austrian Open
1998 WTA Tour